John Lujan III (born June 7, 1962) is a firefighter and former Bexar County sheriff’s deputy, who serves as a Republican member of the Texas House of Representatives for District 118 in San Antonio.

2016 special election for District 118
He won a special election held on January 26, 2016, to represent District 118, which encompasses part of Bexar County. The position opened with the resignation of Democrat Joe Farias. In the November 2016 general election, he ran for election to a full term but was defeated by the Democrat Tomas Uresti. Lujan's term ended on January 9, 2017.

2018 campaign
Lujan sought to return to the legislature in the general election held on November 6, 2018, but was defeated by the Democrat Leo Pacheco, 
23,929 votes (58 percent) to 17,298 (42 percent).

2021 special election for District 118
In August 2021, Texas House representative Leo Pacheco announced that he would resign from serving District 118. Lujan stated that he started receiving calls of encouragement from Republicans, such as House Speaker Dade Phelan. On August 17, 2021, Lujan announced his candidacy for District 118 in a special election to replace Pacheco. On September 28, 2021, Lujan was the top finisher in the special election, getting 42% of the vote, while Democrat Frank Ramirez placed second with 20%, placing Lujan and Ramirez in the runoff.

On November 2, 2021, Lujan won the special election runoff to fill District 118, a district in San Antonio that voted for Joe Biden by fourteen points in 2020 and is 73% Hispanic. Lujan defeated Democrat Frank Ramirez 51.2% to 48.8%.

References

External links
 John Lujan at the Texas Tribune

1962 births
Living people
Republican Party members of the Texas House of Representatives
Hispanic and Latino American state legislators in Texas
21st-century American politicians
Businesspeople from Texas
People from San Antonio
American deputy sheriffs
American firefighters
Latino conservatism in the United States